Niklas Jonsson (born 31 May 1969, in Piteå) is a Swedish cross-country skier who competed from 1990 to 2002. He won the silver medal in the 50 km at the 1998 Winter Olympics in Nagano. At that event, Jonsson started 30 seconds ahead of the gold medal favourite Bjørn Dæhlie. Soon Dæhlie caught up Jonsson, and they were skiing together for most of the distance. Shortly before the finish line, Jonsson escaped, but Dæhlie still finished 20 seconds behind, which was good enough for the gold medal. Jonsson finished second.

Jonsson's best finish at the FIS Nordic World Ski Championships was a fourth in the 50 km in 1999. His best finish was third in four different World Cup events from 1993 to 1999.

Cross-country skiing results
All results are sourced from the International Ski Federation (FIS).

Olympic Games
 1 medal – (1 silver)

World Championships

World Cup

Season standings

Individual podiums
 4 podiums – (4 )

Team podiums
 2 victories – (2 ) 
 11 podiums – (10 , 1 )

References

External links 
 
 

1969 births
Living people
People from Piteå
Swedish male cross-country skiers
Cross-country skiers at the 1992 Winter Olympics
Cross-country skiers at the 1994 Winter Olympics
Cross-country skiers at the 1998 Winter Olympics
Cross-country skiers at the 2002 Winter Olympics
Olympic medalists in cross-country skiing
Medalists at the 1998 Winter Olympics
Piteå Elit skiers
Olympic silver medalists for Sweden
Olympic cross-country skiers of Sweden